The Mayo River is a tributary of the Dan River, which in turn is a tributary of the Roanoke River.  All three rivers flow through the U.S. states of Virginia and North Carolina. It is named for Major William Mayo (ca. 1685-1744).

Course
The Mayo River is formed by two main branches, the North Fork Mayo River and the South Fork Mayo River.  Both forks rise in Patrick County, Virginia, gathering the waters of many tributary streams.  The two forks join in northwestern Rockingham County, North Carolina, forming the Mayo River proper, which then flows south into joining the Dan River near the towns of Mayodan, North Carolina and Madison, North Carolina.

See also
Mayo River State Park
List of Virginia rivers
List of North Carolina rivers

References

External links

Rivers of Virginia
Rivers of North Carolina
Tributaries of the Roanoke River
Rivers of Rockingham County, North Carolina
Rivers of Patrick County, Virginia